Kedar Prasad Giri (May 7, 1944 - November 23, 2018) was a Nepalese judge who served as 18th Chief Justice of Nepal, in office from 5 October 2007 to 7 May 2009. He was appointed by Girija Prasad Koirala. 

He was preceded by Dilip Kumar Poudel and succeeded by Min Bahadur Rayamajhi.

References 

Chief justices of Nepal
1944 births
2018 deaths